Edgar Wilkinson (birth registered October→December 1863 — 27 August 1896) was an English rugby union footballer who played in the 1880s. He played at representative level for England, and Yorkshire, and at club level for Bradford FC, as a forward, e.g. front row, lock, or back row. Prior to Tuesday 27 August 1895, Bradford FC was a rugby union club, it then became a rugby league club, and since 1907 it has been the association football (soccer) club Bradford Park Avenue.

Background
Edgar Wilkinson was born in Bradford, West Riding of Yorkshire, and he died aged 32 in Bradford, West Riding of Yorkshire.

Playing career

International honours
Edgar Wilkinson won caps for England while at Bradford FC in 1886 against Wales, Ireland, and Scotland, in 1887 Wales, and Scotland.

In the early years of rugby football the goal was to score goals, and a try had zero value, but it provided the opportunity to try at goal, and convert the try to a goal with an unopposed kick at the goal posts. The point values of both the try and goal have varied over time, and in the early years footballers could "score" a try, without scoring any points.

Change of Code
When Bradford FC converted from the rugby union code to the rugby league code on Tuesday 27 August 1895, Edgar Wilkinson would have been approximately 32. Consequently, he could have been both a rugby union and rugby league footballer for Bradford FC.

Genealogical information
On 16 July 1887 Edgar married Florence Nelson b 1869, at Holy Trinity Church, Poulton-le-Sands, Lancashire. Following Edgar's premature death in 1896, some 14 years later in 1910, his widow Florence and her children moved to the seaside town of Morecambe, Lancashire, which is where Florence's grandparents had lived for some 24 years.

References

External links
Search for "Wilkinson" at rugbyleagueproject.org
Photograph "Bradford's Yorkshire Rugby Union Cup winning side - Bradford's only Yorkshire Cup winning side of the Rugby Union era. - 01/01/1884" at rlhp.co.uk
Photograph "Bradford (F.C.) c.1888 - This team contained six England internationals. - 01/01/1888" at rlhp.co.uk

1863 births
1896 deaths
Bradford F.C. players
England international rugby union players
English rugby union players
Rugby union forwards
Rugby union players from Bradford
Yorkshire County RFU players